Paris Inostroza (born 22 September 1972) is a Chilean former fencer. He competed in the individual épée events at the 1996, 2004,  2008, and 2012 Summer Olympics.

References

External links
 

1972 births
Living people
Chilean male épée fencers
Olympic fencers of Chile
Fencers at the 1996 Summer Olympics
Fencers at the 2003 Pan American Games
Fencers at the 2004 Summer Olympics
Fencers at the 2007 Pan American Games
Fencers at the 2008 Summer Olympics
Fencers at the 2011 Pan American Games
Fencers at the 2012 Summer Olympics
Sportspeople from Santiago
Pan American Games silver medalists for Chile
Pan American Games bronze medalists for Chile
Pan American Games medalists in fencing
South American Games silver medalists for Chile
South American Games bronze medalists for Chile
South American Games medalists in fencing
Competitors at the 2010 South American Games
Medalists at the 2003 Pan American Games
20th-century Chilean people
21st-century Chilean people